0J (zero J) or 0-J may refer to:

0J, an abbreviation for January 0
0J, an abbreviation for 0 junction power bonds in a Bond graph
0J, an abbreviation for zero jump, a type of Turing jump

See also
OJ (disambiguation)
J0 (disambiguation)